Pamparama is a genus of moths of the family Noctuidae.

Species
 Pamparama acuta (Freyer, 1838)

References
 Natural History Museum Lepidoptera genus database
 Pamparama at funet.fi

Cuculliinae